Oscar Ignacio Gualdoni (born June 16, 1973 in Zárate, Buenos Aires, Argentina) is a former Argentine footballer who played for clubs of Argentina and Chile.

Teams
  Defensores Unidos 1993-1996
  Deportes Puerto Montt 1998-2002
  Villa Dálmine 2003-2007

External links
 

1973 births
Living people
Argentine footballers
Argentine expatriate footballers
Puerto Montt footballers
Primera B de Chile players
Chilean Primera División players
Expatriate footballers in Chile
Association footballers not categorized by position
People from Zárate, Buenos Aires
Sportspeople from Buenos Aires Province